was a town located in Isumi District, Chiba Prefecture, Japan.

Misaki was formed on August 1, 1961 by the merger of the towns of Chōjamachi and Taitō.

On December 5, 2005, Misaki was merged into the towns of Isumi (former) and Ōhara (both from Isumi District), to create the city of Isumi, and thus no longer exists as an independent municipality.

In 2005 (the last data available before its merger into Isumi), the town had an estimated population of 15,273 and a density of 327.3 persons per km2. Its total area was 46.66 km2.

The town's economy was largely based on commercial fishing.

External links
Isumi City Website 

Dissolved municipalities of Chiba Prefecture
Isumi